Ramapurada Ravana is a 1984 Indian Kannada-language film,  directed by  Rajachandra and produced by C. Jayaram and G. Radhakrishna. The film stars Anant Nag, Aarathi, Geetha and Thoogudeepa Srinivas. The film has musical score by Rajan–Nagendra. The film was remade in Tamil as Naam Iruvar.

Plot 
Rudra (Thoogudeepa Srinivas) is an alcoholic Village Man Living in his hometown with his niece, Radha (Geetha (actress)) and Orphan Man Thimma ((M. S. Umesh)) Hanumanth Rao (Ananth Nag) arrives in town as the new teacher and is offered a place to stay at the home of the trustee of the school, Seetha (Aarathi). Rudra and Seetha were in love once but couldn't get married. Her father, Sribivasaiah (K. S. Ashwath) was the town leader and  opposed the match due to Rudra's illiteracy and lack of wealth. Seetha was set to marry a man that her father chose but he died on the wedding day and she remains unmarried. Rudra now spends his days drinking and fighting against the injustices meted out by Chalapathi (C. R. Simha) to the townspeople. Chalapathi smuggles drugs, prints counterfeit cash and has murdered townspeople in his bid to become rich and powerful. He's assisted in his misdeeds by his younger brother Pashupathi (Manu), mistress Mayuri and right-hand man Kempa (Dinesh). 
Rudra turns over a new leaf and gives up drinking after Raja's interference. Raja also begins to teach Hanumanth Rao. Radha and Hanumanth also fall in love. Chalapathi plans to steal the money the townspeople collect to make improvements to the school. His plan is discovered by the Panchayat Board executive officer, Ramalinga (Loknath). Chalapathi's group kills Ramalinga and sets it up to look like he was the thief. This sets Seetha, Rudra and Hanumanth Rao against Chalapathi as the trio work together to uncover the depths of his misdeeds and bring him to justice.

Cast

Anant Nag
Aarathi
Geetha
Thoogudeepa Srinivas
C. R. Simha
Dinesh
Manu
M. S. Umesh
Lokanath
Keerthiraj
K. S. Ashwath
Negro Johnny

Soundtrack
The music was composed by Rajan–Nagendra.

References

1984 films
1980s Kannada-language films
Films scored by Rajan–Nagendra
Kannada films remade in other languages
Films directed by Rajachandra